Marc Wiltberger (born 1969) is a French team handball player. He competed at the 2000 Summer Olympics in Sydney, where the French team placed sixth. In France he plays for the team SC Sélestat.

References

1969 births
Living people
French male handball players
Olympic handball players of France
Handball players at the 2000 Summer Olympics